Melvin Williams (born February 2, 1979) is a former American football defensive end who played two seasons in the National Football League with the New Orleans Saints and San Francisco 49ers. He was drafted by the New Orleans Saints in the fifth round of the 2003 NFL Draft. He played college football at Kansas State University and attended Mehlville High School in Mehlville, Missouri. Williams was also a member of the Miami Dolphins, Washington Redskins and New Orleans VooDoo.

Professional career

New Orleans Saints
Williams was drafted by the New Orleans Saints with the 155th pick in the 2003 NFL Draft. He signed with the Saints on June 3, 2003. He was released by the Saints on October 4, 2004.

San Francisco 49ers
Williams signed with the San Francisco 49ers on October 5, 2004. He was released by the 49ers on October 20, 2004.

Miami Dolphins
William was signed by the Miami Dolphins on November 15, 2004. He was released by the Dolphins on November 23, 2004.

Washington Redskins
Williams signed with the Washington Redskins on December 29, 2004. He became an unrestricted free agent in March 2006.

New Orleans VooDoo
Williams was signed by the New Orleans VooDoo on January 9, 2007.

References

External links
Just Sports Stats
Kansas State Wildcats profile
NFL Draft Scout

Living people
1979 births
Players of American football from St. Louis
American football defensive ends
African-American players of American football
Kansas State Wildcats football players
New Orleans Saints players
San Francisco 49ers players
New Orleans VooDoo players
21st-century African-American sportspeople
20th-century African-American sportspeople